The 13th constituency of the Nord is a French legislative constituency in the Nord département.

Description

Nord's 13th Constituency includes the west of the port city of Dunkerque on the English Channel coast as well as its large southern suburb of Coudekerque-Branche.

The elected conservative members during its first 30 years before switching to the Socialist Party in 1988. Since then the seat has been won by left wing candidates at every election except 1993 and a by-election in 1998.

In fiction it is the seat of the protagonist in the popular French TV series Baron Noir.

Historic Representation

Election results

2022

2017

2012 

 
 
 
 
 
|-
| colspan="8" bgcolor="#E9E9E9"|
|-

2007

 
 
 
 
 
 
|-
| colspan="8" bgcolor="#E9E9E9"|
|-

2002

 
 
 
 
 
|-
| colspan="8" bgcolor="#E9E9E9"|
|-

1997

 
 
 
 
 
 
 
|-
| colspan="8" bgcolor="#E9E9E9"|
|-

Sources
 Official results of French elections from 1998: 

13